The Madison Metropolitan School District (MMSD) is a public school district headquartered in Madison, Wisconsin. It serves the cities of Madison and Fitchburg, the villages of Shorewood Hills and Maple Bluff, and the towns of Blooming Grove and Burke.

The school district includes six high schools, 12 middle schools and 32 elementary schools.

General information
As of the 2020-2021 school year, the district serves 26,121 students, making it the second largest in Wisconsin. It has 52 schools, including 32 elementary schools (grades K-5), 12 middle schools (grades 6–8), four comprehensive high schools and two alternative high schools. The district also has early childhood programs and alternative programs at the secondary level.

In an effort to encourage the involvement of students, the Madison Student Senate (MSS) was formed. It allows eight representatives from each high school (including affiliated alternatives) to meet bi-weekly with members of the board to discuss and change district policies for the benefit of Madison students.

History
The first school in Madison held classes in 1838 in a room of the home of Isaac H. Palmer, with schoolteacher Louisa Brayton. The school district was recognized by the territorial government in December 1841.
Following the incorporation of the city of Madison in 1856, a board of education was organized and the first superintendent was chosen: Damon Kilgore, a teacher who had begun teaching in Madison two years earlier.

First high school
According to the Dane County Historical Society, the county’s first public high school (Madison Central High School (Wisconsin)) began in 1853 in the basement of a Methodist Church, with 90 students and just one teacher. In ensuing years, it had several names, starting as Madison High School, with graduates including noted architect Frank Lloyd Wright. Then in 1922 it was renamed as Madison Central High School after a new school -- Madison East High School—became the city's second high school. Noted artist Georgia O'Keeffe attended Central High School. In 1965, the name was changed to Central-University High School until its closure in 1969.

Desegregation
In December 1983, the Madison School Board adopted a desegregation plan that was implemented on August 28, 1984. The plan aimed to reduce the disproportionate number of minority students at Lincoln and Franklin elementary schools, both on the south side of Madison, to approximately 30%. Franklin Elementary was paired with Randall Elementary and Midvale Elementary with Lincoln Elementary. Since then, Lapham Elementary School and Marquette Elementary School have also joined as sister schools. Franklin, Midvale and Lapham serve grades K-2, and Randall, Lincoln and Marquette serve grades 3–5.

The district allows students to use the pronouns they prefer, something the Wisconsin Supreme Court upheld.

Schools

High schools
Vel Phillips Memorial High School (formerly James Madison Memorial High School)
Madison East High School
Madison West High School
Malcolm Shabazz City High School (alternative high school)
Robert M. La Follette High School

Middle schools

Black Hawk Middle School (formerly Gompers Middle School)
Cherokee Heights Middle School
Velma Hamilton Middle School (formerly Van Hise Middle School)
Thomas Jefferson Middle School

Georgia O'Keeffe Middle School
Ray F. Sennett Middle School
Sherman Middle School
Spring Harbor Middle School

Akira R. Toki Middle School
Annie Greencrow Whitehorse Middle School (formerly Schenk Middle School)
James C. Wright Middle School (originally named Middle School 2000)
Badger Rock Middle School (agro-urban charter)

Elementary schools

Frank Allis Elementary School
Milele Chikasa Anana (formerly Philip H. Falk Elementary School)
César Chávez Elementary School
Crestwood Elementary School
Conrad A. Elvehjem Elementary School
Emerson Elementary School
Franklin Elementary School
Samuel Gompers Elementary School
Hawthorne Elementary School
Henderson Elementary School (formerly Glendale Elementary School)
Ray W. Huegel Elementary School

John F. Kennedy Elementary School
Lake View Elementary School
Lapham Elementary School
Aldo Leopold Elementary School
Abraham Lincoln Elementary School
Charles Lindbergh Elementary School
Lowell Elementary School
Marquette Elementary School
Mendota Elementary School
Midvale Elementary School

John Muir Elementary School
Nuestro Mundo Community School
Paul J. Olson Elementary School
Orchard Ridge Elementary School
Randall Elementary School
Carl Sandburg Elementary School
Schenk Elementary School
Shorewood Hills Elementary School
Glenn Stephens Elementary School
Thoreau Elementary School
Van Hise Elementary School

Leadership

Board of Education 
The district is run by a seven-member school board. Members are elected in April for staggered three-year terms. The superintendent of the district is chosen by the Board.

Partnerships 
The Madison Metropolitan School District has many partnerships in the area. "At Home In Madison" is a partnership of business, community, school and city leaders that provides information to home buyers and relocating families about Madison's schools, neighborhoods and resources for home ownership.

Several before and after school programs are offered by local business and organizations. The local YMCA provides services for several of the local schools, including before and after school programs at Elvehjem, Gompers, Kennedy, Sandburg, and Schenk Elementary schools.  Madison School and Community Recreation (MSCR) offers after school programs known as The Safe Haven Community and Learning Center, to which students must apply in order to participate. The Playful Kids Learning Clubhouse offers after school programs at Crestwood and Muir Elementary schools, and the Red Caboose does so at Lapham and Marquette Elementary schools. The Wisconsin Youth Company offers both before and after school at specific locations.

Madison Metropolitan School District also has a partnership with the local universities and colleges. Forward Madison is a partnership between Madison Metropolitan School District and UW-Madison’s School of Education. As well, students from the University of Wisconsin–Madison, University of Wisconsin–Whitewater, Edgewood College, and Madison Area Technical College are welcomed into the classrooms of several schools within MMSD as a part of their degree program. Additionally, the schools are a resource for research and information for the universities.

Controversies 

In February 2020, the school district was sued by a group of parents, represented by the Wisconsin Institute for Law and Liberty, alleging that new policies regarding "gender identity" were a violation of federal law. The new policy instructs teachers how to assist children as young as five in "social transition" to another gender, and prohibits notifying the parents without the child's permission. This assistance could involve using different names and pronouns, or could include allowing access to opposite sex restrooms, changing rooms, and sports. The plaintiff parents allege this is a violation of parental rights and Family Educational Rights and Privacy Act (FERPA), particularly given that the teachers received instructions on how to avoid triggering FERPA requirements. In September 2020, a Dane County judge issued an injunction prohibiting MMSD from implementing the policy in a way that "allows or requires District staff to conceal information or to answer untruthfully in response to any question that parents ask about their child at school."

In 2021, a controversy developed around an East High School teacher's use of hidden surveillance cameras in hotel bathrooms on a field trip. 

In early 2022, a controversy happened at La Follette High School when a teen was attacked by a group of kids and the school administration did not act appropriately.

References

External links

School districts in Wisconsin
Education in Madison, Wisconsin
School districts established in 1856
1856 establishments in Wisconsin